Vilmoș Szabo (born 30 December 1964) is a retired Romanian sabre fencer. He competed at the 1984, 1992 and 1996 Olympics and won a team bronze medal in 1984.

He is an ethnic Hungarian and he married Olympic foil medallist Reka Zsofia Lazăr. They moved to Germany in 1993 and became fencing coaches at TSV Bayer Dormagen. Since 2008 Vilmoș Szabo coaches the German national sabre team. Under his direction, Nicolas Limbach earned a gold medal in the 2009 World Championships and Germany won the first World team gold medal in their history in the 2014 World Championships.

Szabo and his wife have two sons, Matyas and Marc. Matyas is a sabre fencer and member of the German national team.

References

External links
 

1964 births
Living people
Romanian male fencers
Romanian sabre fencers
Olympic fencers of Romania
Fencers at the 1984 Summer Olympics
Fencers at the 1992 Summer Olympics
Fencers at the 1996 Summer Olympics
Olympic bronze medalists for Romania
Olympic medalists in fencing
Sportspeople from Brașov
Romanian sportspeople of Hungarian descent
Medalists at the 1984 Summer Olympics
Romanian fencing coaches